Kamil Kiereś (born 16 July 1974) is a Polish football manager who is currently  in charge of Ekstraklasa side Stal Mielec.

Honours

Manager
GKS Bełchatów
I liga: 2013–14

Górnik Łęczna
II liga: 2019–20

References

External links
Kamil Kiereś at Footballdatabase

1974 births
Living people
Sportspeople from Piotrków Trybunalski
Ekstraklasa managers
I liga managers
II liga managers
GKS Bełchatów managers
Górnik Łęczna managers
Stal Mielec managers
Polish football managers